"Dance, Bunny Honey, Dance" is a song by Penny McLean released as the first single of her album Penny in 1977. The song managed to appear in two charts worldwide.

Charts

References

1977 singles
Penny McLean songs
Disco songs
1977 songs
Songs with lyrics by Michael Kunze